Service engineering may refer to:

 Building services engineering
 Service-oriented software engineering